Libya competed at the 2020 Summer Paralympics in Tokyo, Japan, from 24 August to 5 September 2021.

Taekwondo

Libya qualified one athlete to compete at the Paralympics competition. Mohamed Alsanousi Abidzar qualified by winning the gold medal at the 2020 African Qualification Tournament in Rabat, Morocco.

See also 
Libya at the Paralympics
Libya at the 2020 Summer Olympics

References 

Nations at the 2020 Summer Paralympics
2020
2021 in Libyan sport